Gyankriti, is an education group which is operating a senior secondary school in Indore, India, since 2013. The organization is founded and managed by two IIT Bombay alumni Akshay Gupta and Yograj Patel right after they opted-out of placements. Gyankriti School is affiliated with CISCE, commonly known as ICSE board.

Gyankriti is mentored directly by Mr. Sunil Handa. He is a profressor at Indian Institute of Management Ahmedabad and founder of Eklavya School, Ahmedabad.

The name is self-explanatory, it is a confluence of knowledge (gyan) and creation (kriti). The logo symbolizes it with a half brush representing creativity and half pen representing logic. This also forms the basis of their registered tagline "Where logic meets creativ!ty"

Curriculum 
Gyankriti offers a child-centered curriculum, which means the content of the program supports all aspects of a child's growth and grooming. The curriculum offers a right combination of activities which improvises development of gross motor skills, fine motor skills, speech, vocabulary, or power of expression, practical life skills.

The school follows the BaLA concept, where the entire school building acts as learning aid. The school building is equipped with play areas, AV projection systems, wooden block rooms etc. The school's teaching methodology is regularly updated on its blog. Gyankriti is trying to maximize the usage of Information and Communication Technology in its schools. Currently they are using moodle for parent school interaction among many other technology tools.

Admissions 
Admission into Gyankriti Schools is based on an all-inclusive policy. Admissions are granted on first-come, first-served basis, which may be based on an evaluation by the school head.

School location 
The school is located in Indore, in front of Crescent Water Park, Jamniya Khurd Village. The school spread over two acres of land in the lap of nature and the building is over 65,000 square feet. The construction work is going on is phases with the fundraiser by IIT alumni community spread across the world.

Sister schools
Many students from other institutes of India are inspired by Prof. Sunil Handa and Eklavya School, and have started their own schools/preschools in various parts of the country. All of them have similar basic thought process and philosophy of education. Here is a list of such schools:
 Gyan Saarthi (Gangapur City, Rajasthan and Tezpur, Assam )
 Sandbox Daycare and Early Learning Centre (Mumbai, Maharashtra)
 The JB School (Hanumangarh District, Rajasthan)
 SR Public School (Kota, Rajasthan)

Modern Gurukul
Study of Sanatan Dharm is a compulsory theme throughout our school curriculum using vedic knowledge, epic stories and role modelling.  We wish to develop and promote academic excellence in Study of Sanatan Dharm by providing a balanced and structured programme of education and research.

Awards and recognition
Semi-finalists of CNBC Awaaz Masterpreneur India - There were 1852 participants in Masterpreneur Season 2. Eleven companies were short-listed from central zone, including Gyankriti. They were also one of the two companies who qualified from the zone for Semi-Finale of the all India show.
The start-up company has been covered by national and local media several times. The coverage on front page of The Hindu Business Line was a prominent one.

References

External links
 

Schools in Madhya Pradesh
Schools in Indore
Education in Indore